Jilin-1 is China's first self-developed commercial remote sensing satellite system. The satellites are operated by Chang Guang Satellite Technology Corporation and named after Jilin Province where the company is headquartered. The first set of satellites were launched by Long March 2D in Jiuquan Satellite Launch Center on 7 October 2015, at 04:13 UTC. All launched Jilin-1 satellites are in sun-synchronous orbit (SSO).

As of 15 January 2023, there were a total of 24 launches of Jilin-1, and 89 satellites in orbit. Chang Guang originally planned to launch 138 total satellites by the year 2025, but expanded its goal in 2022 to 300 satellites Jilin-1 is the largest Chinese commercial satellite constellation in orbit and has enjoyed generous funding since the Chinese government opened satellite imagery to private ventures. Chang Guang received $375 million (USD) of funding for the Jilin-1 program in November 2020.

Satellites

Video satellites 
The Jilin-1 series of satellites includes eight 'Jilin-1 Smart Video Satellites' also written as 'Shipin'. First launched in the Jilin-1 series' inaugural 2015 launch, eight Jilin-1 smart video satellites provide 4K high definition (HD) earth observation color video imagery from sun-synchronous orbit (SSO) with a revisit time (orbital period) of 3.3 days, and a five-year system life expectancy. The reported applications of these smart video satellites range from disaster response and economic monitoring to military and national intelligence collection. These satellites use a gaze imaging pattern, use three-axis stabilization, record full-color video between 437–720 nanometers (using a Bayer filter), weigh between 225–235 kilograms, and are 1230x642x2104 millimeters in size.

Three separate generations of Jilin-1 smart video satellites have been designed and launched with the first generation (01 and 02) launched on 7 October 2015, the second generation (one satellite, 03) launched on 9 January 2017, and the third generation (04–08) launched on both 21 November 2017 and 19 January 2018. Satellites of the second generation of Jilin-1 smart video constellation feature updates to orbital propulsion, computer, power supply, and data transmission systems, based on feedback from first-generation users. It is unclear which upgrades took place between the second and third generations.

Jilin-1 video satellites have been used for supervising the 2013–2017 construction of Saparmurat Turkmenbashy Olympic Stadium in Turkmenistan, recording taxiing aircraft at Hartsfield-Jackson Atlanta International Airport, monitoring forest fire spread along the Sino-Russian border, and recording the launch of a OneSpace suborbital rocket. Jilin-1 drew domestic and international attention after Chang Guang released video from a Jilin-1 smart video satellite purporting to show a traveling Lockheed Martin F-22 Raptor of the United States Air Force.

Spectrum satellites 
The Jilin-1 satellite program also operates two hyperspectral imaging (HSI) satellites named Spectrum-01 and Spectrum-02. Onboard payloads of Spectrum satellites image light from a wavelength of 450 nanometers (visible blue) to 135 micrometers (long-wave infrared) across 26 separate bands. The two Spectrum satellites orbit 528 kilometers above the earth in a sun-synchronous orbit which enables the satellites to image with a consistent geometric relationship with the sun and have a 2-3 day revisit time recording images in 5 meter resolution for visible and near-infrared (NIR), 100 meter resolution for short and medium-wave infrared (SWIR, MWIR), and 150 meter resolution for long-wave infrared (LWIR).

Spectrum 01, also known as 'Jilin Lincao 1', was built with the cooperation of China's forestry system which uses the satellite to analyze the distribution of tree species in forests, detection of forest fires, the identification of diseases and pests, and tracking of the nation's severe desertification. Spectrum 02, also known as 'Wenchang Supercomputer 1' was jointly invested and developed with the Wenchang Aerospace Supercomputing Center, part of the Wenchang International Aerospace City in Hainan Province and is primarily focused on marine ecological monitoring with additional functions in ocean search and rescue and undersea resource exploration.

High-resolution satellites 
The most prevalent satellite series in the Jilin-1 program is the 'high resolution' series with sixty-three launched since June 2019. Despite sharing the name, these satellites have no relation with and are not to be confused with the better known Gaofen dual-use (military and civilian) satellite program. Jilin-1 Gaofen satellites carry both a panchromatic and multispectral imager.

Other satellites 
Other satellites of the Jilin-1 program include a single LQSat verification satellite, the Optical-A satellite, sixty-one high-resolution panchromatic (PAN) and multispectral imaging (MSI) satellites (not to be confused with the separate Gaofen program), three wide-band imaging satellites, and one successfully launched imaging satellite ( or 'Rubik's Cube').

List of satellites

See also 

 Yaogan
 Fanhui Shi Weixing
 Gaofen

References 

Earth observation satellites of China
Commercial Earth imaging satellites
Satellite series